William Brearey (19 April 1645 – 6 March 1702) was Archdeacon of the East Riding from 1675 until his death.

Brearey was born in York and educated at Sidney Sussex College, Cambridge. He held livings at Adel and Guiseley.

References

1645 births
17th-century English Anglican priests
18th-century English Anglican priests
Alumni of Sidney Sussex College, Cambridge
Archdeacons of the East Riding
1702 deaths